Michael Wyschogrod (September 28, 1928 – December 17, 2015) was a Jewish German-American philosopher of religion, Jewish theologian, and activist for Jewish–Christian interfaith dialogue. During his academic career he taught in philosophy and religion departments of several universities in the United States, Europe and Israel.

Early life
Michael Wyschogrod was born in Berlin, Germany, on September 28, 1928, the second child of Paul Wyschogrod and Margaret Ungar. His father, a Hungarian chess master who discouraged his son from pursuing this interest, had moved his family to Berlin from Budapest after the breakup of the Austro-Hungarian Empire a decade earlier. As a child, Wyschogrod spent summers in Budapest, visiting his maternal grandparents. The family fled Nazi Germany and arrived in the United States on July 3, 1939, when Wyschogrod was ten years old.

Education
Wyschogrod associated himself with the Modern Orthodox movement within Orthodox Judaism, and the schools he attended as a child reflect this movement's emphasis on combining high-quality Jewish and secular instruction. He attended the Orthodox Adas Yisroel school in Berlin and then, after emigrating to New York City in 1939, the Yiddish-speaking Yeshiva Torah Vodaas day school in Brooklyn, New York, from which he graduated high school in 1945. It was here that Wyschogrod studied under Rabbi Shlomo Heiman, from whom he came to appreciate "that part of the Torah that cannot be written down but transmitted only in the being of the person whose everyday conduct exemplifies it."  Subsequently he studied Talmud with Rabbi Joseph B. Soloveitchik at Yeshiva University from 1946 to 1952.

He embarked upon the study of philosophy at City College of New York in 1946, where he found himself drawn into the study of Christian Theology after reading the work of Kierkegaard. He completed his B.S.S. in 1949. He then went on to graduate study in philosophy at Columbia University, where he earned his Ph.D. in 1953. He wrote a dissertation which was later published under the title Kierkegaard and Heidegger: the Ontology of Existence.

Teaching career
Wyschogrod taught philosophy at several CUNY colleges and served as the head of the Philosophy Department at Baruch College of the City University of New York. In 1992 he was appointed Professor of Religious Studies at the University of Houston. He has been a guest professor at many universities in Israel, Europe, and the United States such as Bar Ilan University in Israel, University of Bern in Switzerland and Yeshiva University in New York, among others.

Thought
Wyschogrod has been concerned primarily, in his activism and in his scholarly work, with the relationship, especially the theological dialogue, between Judaism and Christianity. His book Abraham's Promise: Judaism and Jewish-Christian Relations makes an appeal for a new non-supersessionist Christian view of Judaism. If Judaism and Christianity are to have a stable and harmonious co-existence in the future, then Christianity must dispense with or, at the very least, not openly insist on a status for Judaism in which Judaism is considered an incomplete or antiquated religion.

At the same time, Wyschogrod urges from the Jewish side that Jews not pursue a fallacious dismissal of the divinity of Christ that operates on a priori grounds. In other words, while Jews - Wyschogrod included - can and perhaps even should reject the divinity of Christ, they should not do so by attempting to argue that God's Incarnation in man is somehow inconsistent with the teaching of the Hebrew Bible. On the contrary, there is much merit to the Christological position that posits "the indwelling of God in Israel by concentrating that indwelling in one Jew rather than leaving it diffused in the people of Jesus as a whole."

Even Wyschogrod's writing that focuses solely on Jewish theology could be said to show evidence of the importance in his thought of dialogue between Jewish and Christian theology. His emphasis on the radical and sublime shock and force of God's choice to enter human history in and through the people of Israel, a unilateral and non-abrogable event, shows an affinity with the thought of the neo-orthodox Protestant theologian Karl Barth, whose work Wyschogrod considered relevant to Jewish theologians.

Writings
Wyschogrod's best-known work is The Body of Faith: God in the People Israel (1989; 2nd edition: The Body of Faith: God and the People Israel). His Abraham's Promise: Judaism and Jewish-Christian Relations (2004) is a collection of some of his most seminal essays on Jewish-Christian relations from throughout his career.

Personal life
Wyschogrod was married to the philosopher Edith Wyschogrod.

Works

Books
 .
 .

as Editor
 .
 .

Notes

References
 Soulen, R. Kendall.
 .

External links
 .
 The Michael Wyschogrod Scholarship Fund

1928 births
2015 deaths
American Modern Orthodox Jews
American people of German-Jewish descent
Philosophers of Judaism
Jewish philosophers
American Jewish theologians
Jewish American writers
City College of New York faculty
City College of New York alumni
Columbia Graduate School of Arts and Sciences alumni
Christian and Jewish interfaith dialogue
German emigrants to the United States
21st-century American Jews